Lokomotiv Novosibirsk, commonly known as Sibirtelecom Lokomotiv for sponsorships reasons, was a Russian professional basketball club that was based in Novosibirsk, Russia. Founded 1973, the team competed in the Russian Superleague B. In 2011, Lokomotiv was dissolved.

External links
Official Website

Defunct basketball teams in Russia
Sport in Novosibirsk
Basketball teams in the Soviet Union